1937 in sports describes the year's events in world sport.

Alpine skiing
FIS Alpine World Ski Championships
7th FIS Alpine World Ski Championships are held at Chamonix, France.  The events are a downhill, a slalom and a combined race in both the men's and women's categories.  The winners are:
 Men's Downhill – Emile Allais (France)
 Men's Slalom – Emile Allais (France)
 Men's Combined – Emile Allais (France)
 Women's Downhill – Christl Cranz (Germany)
 Women's Slalom – Christl Cranz (Germany)
 Women's Combined – Christl Cranz (Germany)

American football
 NFL Championship – the Washington Redskins won 28–21 over the Chicago Bears at Wrigley Field.
 First Cotton Bowl Classic is played in Dallas.
 Pittsburgh Panthers – college football national championship
 The Cleveland Rams join the National Football League.

Association football
England
 First Division – Manchester City win the 1936–37 title.
 FA Cup – Sunderland beat Preston North End 3–1.
Spain
 La Liga – not contested due to the Spanish Civil War
Germany
 German football championship won by Schalke 04
Italy
 Serie A won by Bologna
Portugal
 Primeira Liga won by S.L. Benfica
France
 French Division 1 won by Olympique de Marseille
Sweden
 Allsvenskan 1936/1937: AIK

Australian rules football
Victorian Football League
 25 September – Geelong wins the 41st VFL Premiership, defeating Collingwood 18.14 (122) to 12.18 (90) in the 1937 VFL Grand Final
 Brownlow Medal awarded to Dick Reynolds (Essendon)
South Australian National Football League
 2 October – Port Adelaide 13.16 (94) defeat South Adelaide 10.10 (70) to win their second consecutive SANFL premiership. 
 Magarey Medal won by Harold Hawke (North Adelaide)
Western Australian National Football League
 9 October – East Fremantle 14.13 (97) defeat Claremont 13.9 (87) to win their eighteenth premiership.
 Sandover Medal won by "Scranno" Jenkins (South Fremantle).

Baseball
 World Series – New York Yankees defeat New York Giants, 4–1.
 Hall of Fame election – Continuing toward the goal of 10 initial inductees from the 20th century, voters select Nap Lajoie, Tris Speaker and Cy Young. A special committee selects managers Connie Mack and John McGraw, former league presidents Morgan Bulkeley and Ban Johnson, and pioneer shortstop/promoter George Wright. Selections of nineteenth-century players are postponed.
 Aguilas Cibaenas, a club of Dominican Republic, officially founded in Santiago de los Caballeros on January 28.

Basketball
Events
Major professional basketball returns with the formation of the National Basketball League.
 Eurobasket 1937 – Lithuania win the second European basketball championship.
 The fifth South American Basketball Championship in Valparaíso and Santiago is won by Chile.
 The first NAIA Division I men's basketball tournament played in Kansas City.

Boxing
Events
 22 June – Joe Louis defeats James J. Braddock at Chicago by an eighth-round knockout to win the World Heavyweight Championship.
 30 August – in his first title defence, Louis defeats Tommy Farr at Bronx on a fifteen-round decision
Lineal world champions
 World Heavyweight Championship – James J. Braddock → Joe Louis
 World Light Heavyweight Championship – John Henry Lewis
 World Middleweight Championship – vacant
 World Welterweight Championship – Barney Ross
 World Lightweight Championship – Lou Ambers
 World Featherweight Championship – vacant → Henry Armstrong
 World Bantamweight Championship – Sixto Escobar → Harry Jeffra
 World Flyweight Championship – vacant → Benny Lynch

Cricket
Events
 England tours Australia, losing the five-Test series two games to three, despite winning the first two games.
England
 County Championship – Yorkshire
 Minor Counties Championship – Lancashire Second Eleven
 Most runs – Wally Hammond 3,252 @ 65.04 (HS 217)
 Most wickets – Tom Goddard 248 @ 16.76 (BB 10–113)
 New Zealand play a three-test series against England, losing the series one Test to nil with two draws.
 Wisden Cricketers of the Year – Tom Goddard, Joe Hardstaff, Jr., Leonard Hutton, Jim Parks, Sr., Eddie Paynter
Australia
 Sheffield Shield – Victoria
 Most runs – Don Bradman 1,552 @ 86.22 (HS 270)
 Most wickets 
 Chuck Fleetwood-Smith 53 @ 20.24 (BB 8–79)
 Frank Ward 53 @ 28.41 (BB 7–127)
India
 Ranji Trophy – Nawanagar beat Bengal by 256 runs
 Bombay Pentangular – Muslims
New Zealand
 Plunket Shield – Auckland
South Africa
 Currie Cup – not contested
West Indies
 Inter-Colonial Tournament – Trinidad

Cycling
Tour de France
 Roger Lapébie wins the Tour de France.
Giro d'Italia
 Gino Bartali of Legnano wins the 25th Giro d'Italia

Field hockey
 July 14 – foundation of HC Den Bosch, a Dutch club based in 's-Hertogenbosch

Figure skating
 World Figure Skating Championships –
 Men's champion: Felix Kaspar, Austria
 Ladies’ champion: Megan Taylor, Great Britain
 Pair skating champion: Maxi Herber & Ernst Baier, Germany

Golf
Men's professional
 Masters Tournament – Byron Nelson
 PGA Championship – Denny Shute
 U.S. Open – Ralph Guldahl
 British Open – Henry Cotton
Men's amateur
 British Amateur – Robert Sweeny Jr.
 U.S. Amateur – Johnny Goodman
Women's professional
 Women's Western Open – Helen Hicks
 Titleholders Championship – Patty Berg

Horse racing
Steeplechases
 Cheltenham Gold Cup – not held due to flooding of Cheltenham Racecourse
 Grand National – Royal Mail
Hurdle races
 Champion Hurdle – Free Fare
Flat races
 Australia – Melbourne Cup won by The Trump
 Canada – King's Plate won by Goldlure
 France – Prix de l'Arc de Triomphe won by Corrida
 Ireland – Irish Derby Stakes won by Phideas
 English Triple Crown Races:
 2,000 Guineas Stakes – Le Ksar
 The Derby – Mid-day Sun
 St. Leger Stakes –  Chulmleigh
 United States Triple Crown Races:
 Kentucky Derby – War Admiral
 Preakness Stakes – War Admiral
 Belmont Stakes – War Admiral

Ice hockey
 April 15 – The Detroit Red Wings defeat the New York Rangers 3–0 to win the 1937 Stanley Cup Final
 April 17 – The Winnipeg Monarchs defeat the Copper Cliff Redmen 7–0 to win the 1937 Memorial Cup

Motorsport

Nordic skiing
FIS Nordic World Ski Championships
 10th FIS Nordic World Ski Championships 1937 are held at Chamonix, France

Rowing
The Boat Race
 24 March — Oxford wins the 89th Oxford and Cambridge Boat Race

Rugby league
1936–37 European Rugby League Championship
1937 New Zealand rugby league season
1937 NSWRFL season
1936–37 Northern Rugby Football League season / 1937–38 Northern Rugby Football League season

Rugby union
 50th Home Nations Championship series is won by England

Snooker
 World Snooker Championship – Joe Davis beats Horace Lindrum 32–29

Speed skating
Speed Skating World Championships
 Men's All-round Champion – Michael Staksrud (Norway)
 Women's All-round Champion – Laila Schou Nilsen (Norway)

Tennis
Australia
 Australian Men's Singles Championship – Vivian McGrath (Australia) defeats John Bromwich (Australia) 6–3, 1–6, 6–0, 2–6, 6–1
 Australian Women's Singles Championship – Nancye Wynne Bolton (Australia) defeats Emily Hood Westacott (Australia) 6–3, 5–7, 6–4
England
 Wimbledon Men's Singles Championship – Don Budge (USA) defeats Gottfried von Cramm (Germany) 6–3, 6–4, 6–2
 Wimbledon Women's Singles Championship – Dorothy Round Little (Great Britain) defeats Jadwiga Jędrzejowska (Poland) 6–2, 2–6, 7–5
France
 French Men's Singles Championship – Henner Henkel (Germany) defeats Bunny Austin (Great Britain) 6–1, 6–4, 6–3
 French Women's Singles Championship – Hilde Krahwinkel Sperling (Germany) defeats Simonne Mathieu (France) 6–2, 6–4
USA
 American Men's Singles Championship – Don Budge (USA) defeats Gottfried von Cramm (Germany) 6–1, 7–9, 6–1, 3–6, 6–1
 American Women's Singles Championship – Anita Lizana (Chile) defeats Jadwiga Jędrzejowska (Poland) 6–4, 6–2
Davis Cup
 1937 International Lawn Tennis Challenge –  4–1  at Centre Court, Wimbledon (grass) London, United Kingdom

Yacht racing
 The New York Yacht Club retains the America's Cup as Ranger defeats British challenger Endeavour II, of the Royal Yacht Squadron, 4 races to 0

Awards
 Associated Press Male Athlete of the Year – Don Budge, Tennis
 Associated Press Female Athlete of the Year – Katherine Rawls, Swimming

References

 
Sports by year